
Year 193 BC was a year of the pre-Julian Roman calendar. At the time it was known as the Year of the Consulship of Merula and Thermus (or, less frequently, year 561 Ab urbe condita). The denomination 193 BC for this year has been used since the early medieval period, when the Anno Domini calendar era became the prevalent method in Europe for naming a year.

Events 
 By place 
 Greece 
 Eumenes II of Pergamum appeals to Rome for help against the Seleucid king Antiochus III who is threatening to conquer Greece. The Roman pro-consul Titus Quinctius Flamininus supports the Roman championship of Greek autonomy in Anatolia.
 Flamininus is sent to negotiate with Antiochus III and warns him not to interfere with the Greek states. Antiochus does not accept that Flamininus has the authority to speak for the Greeks and promises to leave Greece alone only if the Romans do the same.
 Flamininus attempts to rally the Greeks against Antiochus III and to counter the pro-Seleucid policy of the Aetolians. When the Aetolians call on Antiochus III for aid, Flamininus persuades the Achaean League to declare war on both parties.  He also prevents Philopoemen from taking Sparta.
 In the meantime, the Spartan ruler, Nabis, moves to recover lost territory, including Gythium.
 Carneades of Cyrene moves to Athens to found the third or new Academy.

 Egypt 
 Cleopatra I Syra, daughter of Antiochus III and Laodice, marries the Egyptian King Ptolemy V Epiphanes.

Births

Deaths 
 Xiao He, prime minister of the early Han dynasty in China who has been a key figure in Liu Bang's rise to power after the fall of the Qin dynasty

References